"Puffin on Zootiez" (stylized in all caps) is a song by American rapper Future from his ninth studio album I Never Liked You (2022). It was produced by Nils, TM88 and Too Dope.

Composition
In the song, Future highlights his rise from poverty to fame, while also criticizing rappers that are copying him and boasting his wealth. He references him using Zootiez, a cannabis brand that he collaborated with to promote his album I Never Liked You.

Critical reception
The song received generally positive reviews from music critics. Michael Di Gennaro of Exclaim! called it the "perhaps the most addicting" and the "smoothest" song on I Never Liked You, describing it as "a gorgeous piece of luxury rap that sounds like it was recorded from the leather seats of the limousine Future sits in on the album's cover." Alphonse Pierre of Pitchfork wrote, "The eeriness of 'Puffin on Zootiez' might make you believe Future is saying more than he actually is, but it's OK because his downbeat yet rapid delivery and the ornate instrumental carry the song." Aron A. HotNewHipHop considered it one of the best songs from the album, also calling it "a perfect pairing of Future's ear for hazy production and stream-of-conscious songwriting" and writing, "Future's vocals are at ease on the record, providing a calmness that sounds like a marriage between several Backwoods and a selection of Better House Fragrances burning in the studio."

Music video
The official music video was released on June 2, 2022. Directed by Nick Walker, it sees Future rapping in hazy spaces, under neon lights of varying colors; the blurry and smoky visuals represent his intoxication. He appears to be loitering in the streets late at night.

Charts

Weekly charts

Year-end charts

Certifications

References

2022 songs
Future (rapper) songs
Songs written by Future (rapper)
Songs written by TM88
Songs about cannabis